The 2021–22 Louisville Cardinals men's basketball team represented the University of Louisville during the 2021–22 NCAA Division I men's basketball season. The team played its home games on Denny Crum Court at the KFC Yum! Center in downtown Louisville, Kentucky as members of the Atlantic Coast Conference. They were led by interim head coach Mike Pegues. The Cardinals finished the season 13–19 overall and 6–14 in ACC play to finish in a three way tie for eleventh place.  As the eleventh seed in the ACC tournament, they defeated fourteenth seed Georgia Tech in the First Round before losing to sixth seed Virginia in the Second Round. 

Head coach Chris Mack was fired on January 26, 2022 after starting the season 11–9. Associate coach Mike Pegues was named the interim coach for the remainder of the season. On March 16, the school named former Louisville player Kenny Payne the team's new head coach.

Previous season
In a season limited due to the ongoing COVID-19 pandemic, the Cardinals finished the season 13–7, 8–5 to finish in seventh place in ACC play. They lost to Duke in the second round of the ACC tournament. They were listed as an alternate team for the NCAA tournamentshould a team be unable to participate due to COVID-19 issues. The team declined an invitation to the National Invitation Tournament prior to the NCAA Tournament field being announced. When all teams were able to participate in the opening rounds of the NCAA tournament, the Cardinals season ended.

Offseason

Suspension of Chris Mack
On August 27, 2021, the school announced that head coach Chris Mack would be suspended for the first six games of the season due to his part in an attempt by former assistant Dino Gaudio to blackmail Mack. Gaudio, who was a longtime assistant to Mack and whom Mack had let go following the completion of the 2020–21 season, had attempted to blackmail Mack with allegations of relatively minor misconduct by Mack and the team in violation of NCAA rules. The school said that Mack was being suspended for failing to follow university guidelines regarding the matter. Gaudio pled guilty to extortion for his actions in the matter.

Departures

Incoming transfers

2021 recruiting class

2022 recruiting class

Roster

Schedule and results

|-
!colspan=12 style=| Exhibition

|-
!colspan=12 style=| Regular season

|-
!colspan=12 style=| ACC Tournament

Schedule Source:

Rankings

*AP does not release post-NCAA tournament rankings^Coaches did not release a Week 2 poll.

References

Louisville Cardinals men's basketball seasons
Louisville
Louisville Cardinals men's basketball, 2020-21